Enteromius brazzai is a species of ray-finned fish in the genus Enteromius which occurs in the central Congo Basin and some other rivers in Gabon, Central African Republic and Cameroon.

The fish is named in honor of Franco-Italian explorer Pierre Savorgnan de Brazza (1852-1905), who collected the type specimen.

References

 

Enteromius
Taxa named by Jacques Pellegrin
Fish described in 1901